Illegal Business? is Mac Mall's debut album. It was released on July 13, 1993, and is considered a classic West Coast rap album.  It was produced by Khayree. A single, "Ghetto Theme," was released, for which Tupac Shakur directed the music video. The album peaked at #71 on the Billboard charts.

Track listing

References

 

1993 debut albums
Mac Mall albums